Baltimore Highlands station is a Baltimore Light Rail stop in Halethorpe, Maryland. There are currently 50 free parking spaces. There are no bus connections at this station.

The Baltimore Highlands stop currently does not have any bus lines operating directly around the station, though buses do operate on Annapolis Road nearby. When the station opened in 1993, it was served by Route 30, but complaints from area residents forced buses to be diverted to the nearby Patapsco stop, where they operate today.

The stop is located on Baltimore Street between Florida and Georgia Avenues, north of the site of the former Baltimore and Annapolis Railroad station between Georgia and Illinois Avenues, which was across from the Washington, Baltimore and Annapolis Electric Railroad station. It is also located near a model airplane club called the South West Area Park model air flying field.

Station layout

References

External links
Schedules
Baltimore Highlands Light Rail Stop on Google Street View
Station portal (local train times)

Baltimore Light Rail stations
Halethorpe, Maryland
Railway stations in the United States opened in 1993
1993 establishments in Maryland
Railway stations in Baltimore County, Maryland
Railway stations in the United States opened in 1887